Virovo may refer to:
 Virovo, Demir Hisar, North Macedonia
 Virovo (Arilje), Serbia